National Crime Prevention Council is an American educational 501(c)(3) nonprofit organization in Washington, D.C. whose mission is to enable people to create safer and more caring communities by addressing the causes of crime, drugs and violence and reducing the opportunities for crime to occur.

The organization is perhaps best known for its mascot McGruff the Crime Dog, a Bloodhound dog character created to educate children about crime prevention. Paul DelPonte, a one-time federal whistleblower, was appointed to head the organization in 2021.

History
Carl M. Loeb, Jr. (son of banker John Langeloth Loeb Sr.), was a former vice chairman of the board of directors of the National Council on Crime and Delinquency. Loeb left that group in order to found the National Crime Prevention Council in 1982, where he served as its chairman. After more than two generations of helping Americans Take A Bite Out Of Crime®, the organization is mounting an ambitious effort to introduce the iconic crime dog to the next generation of crime stoppers. A core of the effort aims to link crime prevention with health.

Recent Events 

Working with the United States Patent and Trademark Organization, the Council is mounting an extensive national campaign to warn consumers on the hazard of purchasing counterfeit goods. "No young person wants to be duped by fake products," said Paul DelPonte, Executive Director of NCPC. "This campaign equips them with the skills to take a bite out of counterfeits. It will save lives and will help choke off a growing global criminal enterprise." The campaign features new ads with McGruff in 3D animation, as well as a race car driven by NASCAR's Joey Gase.

In December 2021, McGruff and a public service announcement on kidnapping were featured in the animated television series the Family Guy. The reemergence of the iconic Crime Dog generated an outpouring of public support. In July 2022, McGruff made his first full-length movie debut in Disney's Chip 'n Dale: The Rescue Rangers.   

In October 2022 the organization launched the Lives Project, to call attention to the growing fentanyl crisis. In December of the same year, the organization wrote U.S. Attorney General Merrick Garland asking for an investigation into sale of fake drugs containing fentanyl.  The following month an investigation was opened.

References

External links
 

Civil crime prevention
Organizations established in 1982
Non-profit organizations based in Maryland